A nerd is a person seen as overly intellectual, obsessive, introverted or lacking social skills. Such a person may spend inordinate amounts of time on unpopular, little known, or non-mainstream activities, which are generally either highly technical, abstract, or relating to topics of science fiction or fantasy, to the exclusion of more mainstream activities. Additionally, many so-called nerds are described as being shy, quirky, pedantic, and unattractive.

Originally derogatory, the term "nerd" was a stereotype, but as with other pejoratives, it has been reclaimed and redefined by some as a term of pride and group identity.

Etymology
The first documented appearance of the word nerd is as the name of a creature in Dr. Seuss's book If I Ran the Zoo (1950), in which the narrator Gerald McGrew claims that he would collect "a Nerkle, a Nerd, and a Seersucker too" for his imaginary zoo. The slang meaning of the term dates to 1951. That year, Newsweek magazine reported on its popular use as a synonym for drip or square in Detroit, Michigan. By the early 1960s, usage of the term had spread throughout the United States, and even as far as Scotland. At some point, the word took on connotations of bookishness and social ineptitude.

An alternate spelling, as nurd or gnurd, also began to appear in the mid-1960s, or early 1970s. Author Philip K. Dick claimed to have coined the "nurd" spelling in 1973, but its first recorded use appeared in a 1965 student publication at Rensselaer Polytechnic Institute (RPI). Oral tradition there holds that the word is derived from knurd (drunk spelled backwards), which was used to describe people who studied rather than partied. The term gnurd (spelled with the "g") was in use at the Massachusetts Institute of Technology (MIT) by the year 1965. The term "nurd" was also in use at the Massachusetts Institute of Technology as early as 1971.

According to Online Etymology Dictionary, the word is an alteration of the 1940s term "nert " (meaning "stupid or crazy person"), which is in itself an alteration of "nut" (nutcase).

The term was popularized in the 1970s by its heavy use in the sitcom Happy Days.

Culture

Stereotype
Because of the nerd stereotype, many smart people are often thought of as nerdy. This belief can be harmful, as it can cause high-school students to "switch off their lights" out of fear of being branded as a nerd, and cause otherwise appealing people to be considered nerdy simply for their intellect. It was once thought that intellectuals were nerdy because they were envied. However, Paul Graham stated in his essay, "Why Nerds are Unpopular", that intellect is neutral, meaning that you are neither loved nor despised for it. He also states that it is only the correlation that makes smart teens automatically seem nerdy, and that a nerd is someone that is not socially adept enough. Additionally, he says that the reason why many smart kids are unpopular is that they "don't have time for the activities required for popularity."

Stereotypical nerd appearance, often lampooned in caricatures, can include very large glasses, braces, buck teeth, severe acne and pants worn high at the waist. Following suit of popular use in emoticons, Unicode released in 2015 its "Nerd Face" character, featuring some of those stereotypes: 🤓 (code point U+1F913). In the media, many nerds are males, portrayed as being physically unfit, either overweight or skinny due to lack of physical exercise. It has been suggested by some, such as linguist Mary Bucholtz, that being a nerd may be a state of being "hyperwhite" and rejecting African-American culture and slang that "cool" white children use. However, after the Revenge of the Nerds movie franchise (with multicultural nerds), and the introduction of the Steve Urkel character on the television series Family Matters, nerds have been seen in all races and colors as well as more recently being a frequent young East Asian or Indian male stereotype in North America. Portrayal of "nerd girls", in films such as She's Out of Control, Welcome to the Dollhouse and She's All That depicts that smart but nerdy women might suffer later in life if they do not focus on improving their physical attractiveness.

In the United States, a 2010 study published in the Journal of International and Intercultural Communication indicated that Asian Americans are perceived as most likely to be nerds, followed by White Americans, while non-White Hispanics and African Americans were perceived as least likely to be nerds. These stereotypes stem from concepts of Orientalism and Primitivism, as discussed in Ron Eglash's essay "Race, Sex, and Nerds: From Black Geeks to Asian American Hipsters".

Some of the stereotypical behaviors associated with the "nerd" stereotype have correlations with the traits of Asperger syndrome or other autism spectrum conditions.

Pride
The rise of Silicon Valley and the American computer industry at large has allowed many so-called "nerdy people" to accumulate large fortunes and influence media culture. Many stereotypically nerdy interests, such as superhero, fantasy and science fiction works, are now international popular culture hits. Some measures of nerdiness are now allegedly considered desirable, as, to some, it suggests a person who is intelligent, respectful, interesting, and able to earn a large salary. Stereotypical nerd qualities are evolving, going from awkwardness and social ostracism to an allegedly more widespread acceptance and sometimes even celebration of their differences.

Johannes Grenzfurthner, researcher, self-proclaimed nerd and director of nerd documentary Traceroute, reflects on the emergence of nerds and nerd culture:

In the 1984 film Revenge of the Nerds, Robert Carradine worked to embody the nerd stereotype; in doing so, he helped create a definitive image of nerds. Additionally, the storyline presaged, and may have helped inspire, the "nerd pride" that emerged in the late 1990s. American Splendor regular Toby Radloff claims this was the movie that inspired him to become "The Genuine Nerd from Cleveland, Ohio." In the American Splendor film, Toby's friend, American Splendor author Harvey Pekar, was less receptive to the movie, believing it to be hopelessly idealistic, explaining that Toby, an adult low income file clerk, had nothing in common with the middle class kids in the film who would eventually attain college degrees, success, and cease being perceived as nerds. Many, however, seem to share Radloff's view, as "nerd pride" has become more widespread in the years since. MIT professor Gerald Sussman, for example, seeks to instill pride in nerds:

Bullying
Individuals who are labeled as "nerds" are often the target of bullying due to a range of reasons that may include physical appearance or social background. Paul Graham has suggested that the reason nerds are frequently singled out for bullying is their indifference to popularity or social context, in the face of a youth culture that views popularity as paramount. However, research findings suggest that bullies are often as socially inept as their academically better-performing victims, and that popularity fails to confer protection from bullying. Other commentators have pointed out that pervasive harassment of intellectually-oriented youth began only in the mid-twentieth century and some have suggested that its cause involves jealousy over future employment opportunities and earning potential.

In popular culture
Several memorable nerdy characters appear in old media, including Anthony Michael Hall's character of Brian Johnson in The Breakfast Club and Lewis Skolnick and Gilbert Lowe from Revenge of the Nerds.
The parody song and music video "White & Nerdy" by "Weird Al" Yankovic also prominently features and celebrates aspects of nerd culture.
Slashdot uses the tagline "News for nerds. Stuff that matters." The Charles J. Sykes quote "Be nice to nerds. Chances are you'll end up working for one" has been popularized on the Internet and incorrectly attributed to Bill Gates. In Spain, Nerd Pride Day has been observed on May 25 since 2006, the same day as Towel Day, another somewhat nerdy holiday. The date was picked as it is the anniversary of the release of Star Wars.
An episode from the animated series Freakazoid!, titled "Nerdator", includes the use of nerds to power the mind of a Predator-like enemy. Towards the middle of the show, he gave this speech:

The Danish reality TV show FC Zulu, known in the internationally franchised format as FC Nerds, established a format wherein a team of nerds, after two or three months of training, competes with a professional soccer team.
Australian events such as Oz Comic-Con (a large comic book and Cosplay convention, similar to San Diego Comic-Con International) and Supernova, are incredibly popular events among the culture of people who identify themselves as nerds. In 2016, Oz Comic-Con in Perth saw almost 20,000 cos-players and comic book fans meet to celebrate the event, hence being named a "professionally organised Woodstock for geeks".
Fans of the Vlogbrothers (a YouTube channel starring John and Hank Green) call themselves "nerdfighters" and refer to the fan base as a whole as "Nerdfighteria".
Mathew Klickstein produces and hosts an interview-based, nerd-focused podcast called NERTZ that first debuted in February 2016 via Wired before being picked up by Heavy Metal in June 2020.

See also

Anti-intellectualism
Egghead
Emo
Emotional intelligence
Furry
Gamer
Geek
Greaser
Girly girl
Intellectualism
Jock
Preppy
Scene
Otaku
Social intelligence
Social skills

References

Further reading
 
 
 Genuine Nerd (2006) – Feature-length documentary on Toby Radloff.
 
 
 
 Newitz, A. & Anders, C. (Eds) She's Such a Geek: Women Write About Science, Technology, and Other Nerdy Stuff. Seal Press, 2006.
 
 .

External links

 "The Well-Dressed Geek: Media Appropriation and Subcultural Style" (Paper by Jason Tocci presented at the MIT5 conference. PDF, 180kb).
 "Why Nerds are Unpopular", an essay by Paul Graham about the conformist society in American high schools.
 "The Nerds Have Won", an article by Brian Hayes in American Scientist, September–October 2000.

Academic culture
Anti-intellectualism
Computing culture
English-language slang
 
Gaming
Intelligence
Internet culture
Epithets related to nerd culture
Stereotypes
Stock characters
Subcultures
Social class subcultures
1950s neologisms